El Salvador participated in the 2015 Parapan American Games.

Competitors
The following table lists El Salvador's delegation per sport and gender.

Goalball

Women's tournament
Ana Avalos
Blanca Alicia Cubillas Diaz
Jhosselin Garcia Ventura
Silvia Molina Gonzalez
Xiomara Peña Argueta
Veronica Rivas

Powerlifting

Men

Swimming

Men

Table tennis

Men

Wheelchair basketball

Women
Maritza Bautista
Deysi Bernal
Luz M Bonilla
Marleny Chavez
Morena Escalante
Maritza Lopez
Mirian Lopez
Blanca Siguenza
Irene I Villeda
Zuleyma Zelaya

Wheelchair tennis

Ecuador sent two male athletes to compete.

References

2015 in Panamanian sport
Nations at the 2015 Parapan American Games
Panama at the Pan American Games